Ingrid Elizabeth Andress (born September 21, 1991) is an American country music singer-songwriter. Her breakthrough single, "More Hearts Than Mine" peaked at number 30 on the Billboard Hot 100. Andress released her debut studio album Lady Like in March 2020, to critical acclaim. In 2021, she collaborated with Sam Hunt on the single "Wishful Drinking", which became her second entry on the Billboard Hot 100. Her second studio album, Good Person, followed in 2022.

Life and career

1991–2017: Early life and career beginnings
Andress was born in Southfield, Michigan and grew up in Highlands Ranch, Colorado. She has three sisters and a brother and was mostly homeschooled until high school since her father was a professional baseball coach for the Colorado Rockies and they traveled often. As a child, she learned to play piano and drums. In middle school, she frequently listened to Coldplay and Evanescence and she started a heavy metal music band. She attended Rock Canyon High School, where she participated in high school choir competitions. Andress attended Berklee College of Music and majored in songwriting and performance, although she was frustrated with the school's emphasis on theory and dropped out. She joined a cappella group Pitch Slapped and performed on the NBC singing competition The Sing-Off. Andress later joined the group Delilah and placed sixth. After leaving the show, Andress finished her degree in 2013 and underwent a mentorship with her former teacher at Berklee and pop songwriter Kara DioGuardi. She then moved to Nashville, Tennessee, and signed a publishing deal with Sea Gayle Music and Arthouse Entertainment in 2014. From there, she began writing songs for artists such as Sam Hunt, Alicia Keys, Charli XCX, and Why Don't We.

2018–2020: Breakthrough with Lady Like
Andress signed a recording contract with Warner Nashville and Atlantic Records in July of 2018. In February 2019, her first song with the label, "Lady Like", was released to digital platforms and was a top ten debut on Top Country Albums.

In April 2019, she released the single "More Hearts Than Mine", which reached the top five of the American and Canadian country airplay charts. In 2019, she embarked on her first headlining tour, the Lady Like Tour, in North America and Europe. On March 27, 2020, she released her debut studio album Lady Like through Warner Music Nashville. In April 2020, Andress reached No. 1 on the Billboard Emerging Artists chart. 

In July 2020, she released "The Stranger", which peaked at number 49 on Country Airplay. The deluxe edition of Lady Like was released on October 2, 2020. At the 63rd Annual Grammy Awards, Andress received three Grammy Awards nominations; Best Country Song ("More Hearts Than Mine"), Best Country Album (Lady Like), and Best New Artist, making her the only country artist in the general field categories.

2021–present: Good Person
In 2021, Andress served as the opening act for Dan + ShayThe (Arena) Tour. In July 2021, Andress announced the headlining tour the Feeling Things Tour. In August 2021, Andress released "Wishful Drinking", a collaboration with Sam Hunt. The song peaked at number 4 on Country Airplay. The song, though originally not intended for the album, was included as a bonus track and served as the lead single to her sophomore album Good Person. "Wishful Drinking" earned Andress her 4th Grammy Award nomination, for Best Country Duo/Group Performance at the 65th annual ceremony. 

Andress served as the opening act for the North American leg of Keith Urban's The Speed of Now World Tour in 2022. She also embarked on a headlining tour in support of the album, the Good Person Tour, which includes dates in North America and Europe. Two more singles were released from the album; "Seeing Someone Else", which became her first cross-format single and peaked top 25 on the Adult Pop Airplay chart, and "Feel Like This", the album's second country single. The album charted on both the Billboard 200 and the Top Country Albums chart. Andress is also scheduled as the opening act for Walker Hayes in 2023.

Personal life
Andress resides in Nashville. In 2020, during the COVID-19 pandemic, Andress broke up with her boyfriend of six years and entered a new relationship.

Discography

Studio albums

Extended plays

Singles

As lead artist

As featured artist

Promotional singles

Guest appearances

Music videos

Songwriting credits

Awards and nominations

Tours

Headlining
 The Lady Like Tour (2019)
 Feeling Things Tour (2021)
 The Good Person Tour (2023)

Opening act
 Dan + ShayThe (Arena) Tour (2021)
 Keith UrbanThe Speed of Now World Tour (2022)
 Walker HayesDuck Buck Tour (2023)

Notes

References

1991 births
Living people
American women country singers
American country singer-songwriters
Country musicians from Colorado
People from Douglas County, Colorado
Warner Records artists
Berklee College of Music alumni
People from Southfield, Michigan
Country musicians from Michigan
Singer-songwriters from Michigan
21st-century American women
Singer-songwriters from Colorado